Catholic Priests' Association for Justice (CPAJ) is a South Korean association of Catholic priests, whose aim is to establish justice in Korea.

History
It was established on September 26, 1974 as an attempt to resist against military regime of Park Chung-hee. This coalition of Catholic priests emphasized voluntary membership and individual priests' prerogative regarding what information ought to be relayed to their constituents. After the military regime ended, CPAJ currently focuses on reunifying Korea, safeguarding the environment, abolishing National Security Law, and promoting anti-war movements.

In October 2007, CPAJ revealed a corruption scandal of Samsung Group.

On June 30, 2008, CPAJ started participating beef protest regarding import of U.S. beef, which has been suspected to have been infected by bovine spongiform encephalopathy, by celebrating Mass in Seoul and participating candlelight demonstration afterwards.

References

Catholic organizations established in the 20th century
Religious organizations based in South Korea